Mirza Mohammed Hashim (19 October 1921  22 December 2013), commonly known as M. M. Hashim, was an Indian politician, member of parliament and a former home minister of United Andhra Pradesh. He represented Secunderabad parliamentary constituency in 5th Lok Sabha from 1971 to 77 and 6th Lok Sabha from 1977 to 80. Before participating in Lok Sabha elections, he was a member of Andhra Pradesh Legislative Assembly from 1962 to 1971. He was affiliated with the Indian National Congress.

Biography 
He was born to Mirza Abdul Jawad in Mallepally Hyderabad, Andhra Pradesh on 19 October 1921. He was last elected to Rajya Sabha in 1990 and served its member until 1996. He also participated in 1969 Telangana Agitation.

Before joining the Indian National Congress, he was affiliated with Telangana Praja Samithi from 1969 to 1971. He later moved to Congress and served a vice-president of City Congress Committee from 1962 to 1969, president of Pant Education Society, and Tenant Association from 1960 to 1977. He was later appointed as a vice-president of Hut Association and Rickshaw Union, and later convenor of Anti-Communal Associations and Association for Eradication of Poverty. He also served as a general secretary of Nationalist Kashmir Front in 1958.

Prior to electing to Lok Sabha in 1971 Indian general election, he was a member of Andhra Pradesh Legislative Assembly (1962–67) and was re-elected to assembly in 1967 until his second term ended in 1971. During his assembly career, he was appointed as a state Home Minister in 1978 by Marri Chenna Reddy. He was living in Washington D.C., however when Marri Chenna Reddy was re-elected as a chief minister, he invited Hashim to India and appointed him as a member of the Rajya Sabha.

Personal life 
He was married to Khursheed, with whom he had six children, including four daughters and two sons. He later went to Washington D. C. where he died on 22 December 2013 from multimorbidity.

References 

1921 births
2013 deaths
Andhra Pradesh MLAs 1967–1972
Andhra Pradesh MLAs 1962–1967
Home Ministers of Andhra Pradesh
Politicians from Secunderabad
Lok Sabha members from Hyderabad State
India MPs 1977–1979
India MPs 1971–1977
Indian National Congress politicians from Andhra Pradesh
Telangana Praja Samithi politicians